Patricia Jackman is a camogie player with Gailltir and Waterford. Along with her usual sporting role, she is also doing a PhD after she completed her Masters, where she is completing research into sports psychology.

References

External links
 Camogie.ie Official Camogie Association Website

1993 births
Living people
Waterford camogie players
Waterford IT camogie players